Allan Marques Loureiro (born 8 January 1991), commonly known as Allan Marques, or simply Allan, is a Brazilian footballer who plays as a defensive midfielder for Emirati club Al Wahda and the Brazil national team.

After starting out in the Madureira youth system in his home country, he joined Uruguayan club Deportivo Maldonado, but later returned to Brazil and made his professional debut with Vasco da Gama in 2009. Allan joined Italian club Udinese in 2012, and subsequently moved to fellow Serie A side Napoli in 2015.

At international level, he was a part of the Brazil under-20 side that won the 2011 FIFA U-20 World Cup, and later made his senior debut for Brazil in 2018; he was a member of the team that won the 2019 Copa América on home soil.

Club career

Madureira and Deportivo Maldonado
Allan was signed from Madureira by Uruguayan side Deportivo Maldonado at 17 years of age  for an undisclosed fee. However, he was later loaned out to Vasco da Gama back in Brazil; he would not make an appearance for Maldonado.

Vasco da Gama
Allan moved to Vasco da Gama once again still as a youth player, loaned from Deportivo Maldonado. A year after he played for their youth team, he was brought back and promoted to the first-team by coach Dorival Júnior, playing in many crucial games in the club's 2009 season to help the side win the Série B and secure promotion to the top-flight Série A, though he ultimately suffered an injury.

Due to injury, Allan could not compete with Vasco da Gama neither in the Campeonato Carioca nor the 2010 Copa do Brasil. After an initial recovery, he returned to the club's junior team to regain fitness before rejoining the first-team. He then returned to action in the last round of the Série A before the break for the 2011 FIFA U-20 World Cup, playing in the Copa da Hora friendly tournament. The club won the tournament, with Allan contributing to the title, also scoring a goal in a 3–2 victory over Coritiba.

Udinese
In June 2012, Allan signed for Serie A side Udinese for a reported fee of R$7 million from Deportivo Maldonado. He made his debut for Udinese at home at the Stadio Friuli against Juventus, where he created an assist for teammate Andrea Lazzari's goal.

In his first season in Udine, Allan played mostly as a defensive midfielder, recovering and distributing a large number of balls. Manager Francesco Guidolin played him in 36 games in the league out of 38 games, he proved one of the best bargains of the season, defying expectation and playing almost all games as a starter to help Udinese to finish in a surprise fifth-place position, securing qualification to next year's UEFA Europa League.

The following season the club finished 13th in the league in what was Francesco Guidolin's final season with the side. Despite this, Allan excelled in midfield, and scored his first goals for the club as his improvement in Italy continued. His calm and controlled performance in midfield also prompted future Udinese manager Andrea Stramaccioni to suggest that he was now one of the best young midfielders in Europe, comparable to Manchester United's Paul Pogba.

In the 2014–15 season, Allan was to be the top ball-winner of all of Europe's top-five leagues (Premier League, La Liga, Bundesliga, Serie A and Ligue 1) with the most balls won.

Napoli
After reported interest from a number of other clubs, Allan signed for Napoli for €10m plus bonuses in July 2015.

In the 2015–16 season, Allan made his Napoli debut in a pre-season friendly against Lega Pro side FeralpiSalò, which Napoli won 5–2. He made his first Serie A debut for Napoli at home against Sampdoria in the second matchday of the Serie A season, creating an assist for Gonzalo Higuaín with a through-ball that the latter converted with a right-footed shot from the right side of the box, making the scoreline 2–0. Allan was later substituted in the second half for David López. Allan would then receive a start in Napoli's third game of the season, a 2–2 away draw with Empoli, scoring an equalizer in the 78th minute after converting a pass from captain Marek Hamšík.

On 17 September 2015, Allan came off the bench in the 62nd minute against Belgian club Club Brugge in his first ever Europa League game, assisting José Callejón's second goal of the game with a through-ball just minutes after coming on. The match finished 5–0 for Napoli, the club's largest European win and the joint-largest margin of defeat for Brugge, equalling its 6–1 defeat at Monaco in 1988. Allan would go on to score once again and provide another assist in a 5–0 win against Lazio, only three days after the Brugge victory on 20 September, giving manager Maurizio Sarri trust in him for his precise passing and defensive work. On 26 September, Allan scored a goal against defending champions Juventus, with excellent passing and an impressive overall game in a 2–1 home win. On 4 October, Allan would score the opening goal in a 0–4 away rout of Milan in a swift counter-attacking move, where the Brazilian went one-on-one with Milan goalkeeper Diego López.

In the 2016–17 season, Allan had 29 Serie A appearances (1 goal, 5 assists), 8 Champions League appearances culminating in an 86.6% pass completion rate, an average of 2.4 successful tackles per game and he also averaged one key pass (one that led to a goalscoring opportunity) per game.

In the 2017–18 season, Allan played in all 38 Serie A matches, scoring four goals. During that season, Allan extended his contract with Napoli until 2023. In the following season, he featured in 33 Serie A matches and reached the 2018–19 UEFA Europa League quarter-finals with Napoli. In the 2019–20 season, he played in the 2019–20 UEFA Champions League round of 16 home match against Barcelona, which ended 1–1, then he won the 2019–20 Coppa Italia against Juventus, his only silverware with Napoli.

Everton
On 5 September 2020, English club Everton signed Allan for around £21.7m on a three-year deal, to be reunited with former Napoli manager Carlo Ancelotti. He made his debut the following week in a 1–0 win away to Tottenham Hotspur.

Allan suffered an injury to his hamstring on 16 December during an away game against Leicester City, he was replaced in the 41st minute by Andre Gomes; Everton won the game 0–2. Allan was ruled out for the remainder of Everton's games in 2020. He returned to the starting eleven on 1 March against Southampton playing the full 90 minutes, Everton won the game 1–0.

In March 2022, against Newcastle United, Allan was controversially sent off following a tackle on Allan Saint-Maximin. The Brazilian was also given a three-match ban. Everton later went on to win the game 1–0 due to an Alex Iwobi winner in the 99th minute of stoppage time.

Al Wahda
On 27 September 2022, Allan signed a two-year deal with Emirati club Al Wahda.

International career

Under-20
He was called up by Brazilian under-20 coach Ney Franco on 20 August 2011, where he impressed enough at Vasco da Gama to earn a call-up for the 2011 FIFA U-20 World Cup. Brazil's U-20 World Cup-winning side also featured the likes of Oscar, Philippe Coutinho, Casemiro and Danilo, as well as future Napoli teammates Gabriel and Bruno Uvini. Brazil made it to the tournament final, beating Portugal 3–2 in extra time and winning the U20 World Cup for the fifth time.

Senior
Although born in Brazil, Allan holds dual Portuguese-Brazilian nationality, making him eligible to play for Brazil or Portugal. Allan also 'has a distant Italian relative' which qualifies him for an Italian passport and thus the Italian national team. Sky Sport Italia and TV Luna report that he has been asked 'to switch allegiances to the Azzurri' by national coach Roberto Mancini. Manager Tite, on 26 October 2018, named Allan to the Brazilian squad that will face Uruguay and Cameroon in friendlies the following month. However, because these were only exhibition matches, Allan still also remained eligible to play for Portugal and Italy at the time. He made his senior international debut in the former match, held in London on 16 November, which ended in a 1–0 victory to Brazil.

In May 2019, Allan was included in Brazil's 23-man squad for the 2019 Copa América on home soil. On 7 July, he come on as an injury-time substitute in Brazil's 3–1 victory over Peru in the final of the tournament, at the Maracanã Stadium.

Style of play
Allan operates primarily as a defensive midfielder or as a central midfielder in the mezzala role, and is equally comfortable at playing both in an attacking and defensive midfield role; he is also capable of being deployed in a deeper role as a playmaker. As such, he has also been labelled a box-to-box midfielder in the media. He is also capable of playing on the left or right flank, and has even been deployed as a full-back on occasion.

Normally deployed as a holding midfielder in front of the back-line, Allan is known as a dynamic, physically strong, tenacious and energetic right-footed midfielder, with good ball-winning abilities. He also possesses good technique, dribbling skills, pace and good long passing ability, which enables him to start attacking plays after winning back possession. He has been described as a complete and tactically versatile midfielder, who is different from traditional defensive midfielders, due to his reputation for dribbling past defenders and passing the ball through the legs of an opponent, a move known as the nutmeg.

Career statistics

Club

International

Honours
Vasco da Gama
Copa do Brasil: 2011
Campeonato Brasileiro Série B: 2009

Napoli
Coppa Italia: 2019–20

Brazil U20
FIFA U-20 World Cup: 2011

Brazil
Copa América: 2019

References

External links

 ogol.com.br

1991 births
Living people
Footballers from Rio de Janeiro (city)
Brazilian footballers
Brazil youth international footballers
Brazil under-20 international footballers
Brazil international footballers
Association football midfielders
Madureira Esporte Clube players
CR Vasco da Gama players
Udinese Calcio players
S.S.C. Napoli players
Campeonato Brasileiro Série B players
Campeonato Brasileiro Série A players
Serie A players
2019 Copa América players
Copa América-winning players
Brazilian expatriate footballers
Expatriate footballers in Italy
Brazilian expatriate sportspeople in Italy
Brazilian people of Italian descent
Brazilian people of Portuguese descent
Everton F.C. players
Premier League players	
Expatriate footballers in England	
Brazilian expatriate sportspeople in England
Al Wahda FC players
UAE Pro League players
Expatriate footballers in the United Arab Emirates	
Brazilian expatriate sportspeople in the United Arab Emirates